Hylaeus modestus, also known as the modest masked bee, is a species of hymenopteran in the family Colletidae. It is found in North America.

Subspecies
These two subspecies belong to the species Hylaeus modestus:
 Hylaeus modestus citrinifrons (Cockerell, 1896)
 Hylaeus modestus modestus Say, 1837

Unique larva growth
Hylaeus modestus was discovered to have a special secretion that they produce from their Dufour's gland that they use to aid the growth of their larvae as the secretion has a unique chemical compound containing high concentrations of ethyl ester, which is only found in the secretions of Hylaeus modestus, to provide extra nutrition to the larvae as the larvae feed on the secretions placed on the cell walls of their brood chambers so they can have the energy needed to pupate and become adults before the other bee species out-compete them for resources.

References

Further reading

 
 

Colletidae
Articles created by Qbugbot
Insects described in 1837